First Home Saver Accounts (FHSAs) were a 2007 election policy of the Australian Labor Party. FHSAs were offered from 1 October 2008 after a consultation period and passage of the First Home Saver Account Act 2008 through the Parliament of Australia.

FHSAs offer several benefits to first home savers including:
 a variable interest rate;
 a tax rate of 15% (cf the individual's marginal tax rate), that is paid by the FHSA provider;
 17% government contribution, up to a specified limit.
 Tax-free withdrawal.
 Flexibility in determining how much is contributed, up to a maximum account balance cap over the life of the FHSA.
In the 2014-15 Federal Budget, the Federal Government announced plans to wind back and abolish the FHSA scheme.

Eligibility 
To become a FHSA holder an individual must:

 be aged at least 18 and under 65 years
 have and quote a tax file number in their application
 not have previously owned a home in Australia that was their main residence
 not have previously had a first home saver account.

Government FHSA contribution 
For each dollar contributed to a FHSA during a financial year, the government contributes 17 cents up a specified limit. This limit will increase through indexation.

 For the 2008/09 and 2009/10 financial years, the Government FHSA contribution limit was $850. Therefore, to have been eligible for the full amount of the Government FHSA Contribution, the FHSA holder had to contribute $5000.
 For the 2010/11 financial year, the Government FHSA contribution increased to $935. Therefore, a FHSA holder must contribute $5500 to their account during the 2010/11 financial year to be eligible for the full amount of the Government Contribution.

Government FHSA rates and thresholds
Australian Taxation Office's rates and threshold page:

Income Year: Ends 30 June in the given year. Contributions must be received by the fund prior to this date.

Account balance cap: If the balance of the FHSA account exceeds the 'Account balance cap', then the government contribution will be 0.

Contribution Threshold: The governments 17% match will only apply for contributions at, or below this level. Contribute this amount each year to take full advantage of the FHSA scheme.

Maximum government contribution: If the 'Contribution Threshold' is met or exceeded in any financial year, this is the amount the government will contribute.

Withdrawing funds 
To be eligible to close their FHSA and access the funds, an individual must:

 contribute at least $1,000 per year to their account in at least four financial years – the ‘four year rule’
 intend to use the funds to buy or build their first home.

Mortgage diversion 
During his 2010 Budget Speech, Treasurer Wayne Swan announced changes to the operation of FHSA accounts. Previously, when a FHSA holder purchased a house, thus making them ineligible to hold a FHSA, the funds in their FSHA would be transferred to their superannuation account. Under the proposed changes, the Government would allow funds in a FHSA to be paid into an approved mortgage after the FHSA holder satisfied the four year rule.

On 6 October 2010, the Treasurer released an exposure draft on the new measures for public consultation.

On 24 February 2011, Tax Laws Amendment (2011 Measures No. 1) Bill 2011 was introduced to Parliament. On 10 May 2011 it passed both houses, receiving royal assent on 25 May 2011. According to sub-clause 2(1) of the Bill, the changes to the FHSA Act became law on 26 May 2011.

Take-up 
As at the December 2013 quarter, the Australian Prudential Regulation Authority website states there are 46,000 FHSAs containing A$521.5m.

Abolition 
In the 2014-15 Budget, the Federal Government announced the following changes to abolish the first home saver accounts scheme:
 New accounts created in respect of applications made from 7.30pm, Tuesday 13 May 2014 will not be able to access any concessions or the government contribution.
 Eligibility for a government contribution will cease from 1 July 2014. Existing account holders will continue to receive the government contribution for personal contributions made during the 2013-14 income year.
 Tax and social security concessions will cease from 1 July 2015.  Existing account holders will continue to receive all tax and social security concessions associated with these accounts for the 2013–14 and 2014-15 income years.
 Restrictions on withdrawals will be removed from 1 July 2015.

Lists of FHSA providers 
As at 21 May 2013, the Australian Prudential Regulation Authority website lists the following institutions as FHSA providers:
 AMP Bank
 ANZ Bank
 Big Sky Building Society
 Commonwealth Bank
 Beyond Bank Australia
 Credit Union SA
 Defence Bank
 Hume Building Society
 Hunter United Employees' Credit Union
 IMB Bank
 Members Equity Bank
 MyState
 Police Department Employees' Credit Union
 Police Financial Services
 Railways Credit Union
 Teachers Mutual Bank
 Victoria Teachers
 Wyong Council Credit Union

References

External links 
 First Home Saver Account Australian Taxation Office website
 First Home Saver Account on Australian Securities & Investments Commission's MoneySmart website
 APRA First Home Saver Account website
 First Home Saver Account Treasury website

Financial history of Australia